Xavier Rathan-Mayes (born April 29, 1994) is a Canadian professional basketball player for Merkezefendi Bld. Denizli Basket of the Turkish Basketball Super League (BSL). He played college basketball for the Florida State Seminoles.

High school career
Born in Markham, Ontario, he started playing high school basketball at Christian Faith Center Academy in North Carolina. However, the NCAA was declining to accept credits received from the school, prompting him to transfer to Huntington Prep School in West Virginia. At Huntington Prep School, he played with current NBA player Andrew Wiggins, and he was considered a top 30 player in his class.

College career

Rathan-Mayes played three years of college basketball for the Florida State Seminoles between 2014 and 2017.

As a freshman in 2014–15, Rathan-Mayes had three games with 30 points or more. He averaged 14.9 points per game, becoming only the second freshman to lead Florida State in scoring. He was named to the All-ACC Freshman Team. He averaged 11.8 points in 2015–16 and 10.6 points in 2016–17.

Professional career

2017–18 season
After going undrafted in the 2017 NBA draft, Rathan-Mayes played for the New York Knicks in the NBA Summer League and then joined the Westchester Knicks of the NBA G League for the 2017–18 season. On March 5, 2018, he signed a 10-day contract with the Memphis Grizzlies. He played five games for the Grizzlies.

2018–19 season
After playing for the Los Angeles Lakers in the 2018 NBA Summer League, Rathan-Mayes joined AEK Athens of the Greek Basket League for the 2018–19 season. His final game for AEK came on December 29, 2018.

On January 8, 2019, he was acquired by the Texas Legends of the NBA G League. In 25 games played for the Legends, he averaged 14.2 points, 4.6 rebounds, 6 assists and 1.1 steals per game.

On March 28, 2019, he signed with Bnei Herzliya of the Israeli Premier League for the rest of the season. On April 22, 2019, he recorded a season-high 28 points, shooting 6-of-11 from three-point range, along with five rebounds and three assists in a 76–72 win over Ironi Nahariya. He was subsequently named Israeli League Round 28 MVP.

2019–20 season
In July and August 2019, Rathan-Mayes played with the Hamilton Honey Badgers of the Canadian Elite Basketball League (CEBL). He helped the team reach the final of the 2019 season, scoring 24 points in a loss to the Saskatchewan Rattlers.

In October 2019, Rathan-Mayes re-joined the Texas Legends. On December 3, 2019, he was acquired by the Agua Caliente Clippers in a trade.

2020–21 season
On February 26, 2021, Rathan-Mayes joined CSU Sibiu of the Romanian National League.

2021–22 season
On October 18, 2021, Rathan-Mayes signed with the Illawarra Hawks in Australia for the 2021–22 NBL season.

In May 2022, Rathan-Mayes joined the Scarborough Shooting Stars of the CEBL. He played six games between May 26 and June 18.

2022–23 season
On August 3, 2022, Rathan-Mayes signed with Melbourne United in Australia for the 2022–23 NBL season. In his debut for United on October 2, 2022, he recorded 33 points, nine rebounds, and five assists in a 101–97 overtime win over the New Zealand Breakers.

On February 9, 2023, he signed with Merkezefendi Bld. Denizli Basket of the Turkish Basketball Super League (BSL).

National team career
Rathan-Mayes represented his country, Canada, twice in international competition. He participated at the 2012 U-18 Americas Championship and the 2013 U-19 World Championship.

Personal life
His stepfather is former NBA player Tharon Mayes.

Career statistics

NBA Regular season

|-
| style="text-align:left;"| 
| style="text-align:left;"| Memphis
| 5 || 0 || 23.6 || .286 || .071 || .444 || 1.0 || 3.6 || 1.2 || .6 || 5.8
|-
|style="text-align:center;" colspan="2"|Career
| 5 || 0 || 23.6
 || .286 || .071 || .444 || 1.0 || 3.6 || 1.2 || .6 || 5.8
|-

FIBA Champions League

|-
| style="text-align:left;" | 2018–19
| style="text-align:left;" | A.E.K.
| 8 || 21.8 || .343 || .227 || .600 || 2.3 || 3.6 || .4 || 0 || 8.5
|}

Domestic Leagues

Regular season

|-
| 2018–19
| style="text-align:left;"| AEK
| align=center | GBL
| 9 || 21.8 || .333 || .370 || .568 || 2.3 || 2.8 || .6 || 0 || 9.7
|-
| 2021–22
| style="text-align:left;"| ILL
| align=center | NBL
| 28 || 23.81 || .440 || .220 || .640 || 5.57 || 4.18 || 0.86 || 0.18 || 10.21
|-
| 2022–23
| style="text-align:left;"| MEL
| align=center | NBL
| 21 || 29.52 || .430 || .360 || .490 || 5.57 || 4.67 || 1.05 || 0.14 || 13.76
|}

References

External links
Florida State Seminoles bio
RealGM profile

1994 births
Living people
AEK B.C. players
Agua Caliente Clippers players
Basketball people from Ontario
Bnei Hertzeliya basketball players
Canadian expatriate basketball people in Australia
Canadian expatriate basketball people in Greece
Canadian expatriate basketball people in the United States
Canadian men's basketball players
Florida State Seminoles men's basketball players
Hamilton Honey Badgers players
Illawarra Hawks players
Melbourne United players
Memphis Grizzlies players
National Basketball Association players from Canada
Scarborough Shooting Stars players
Shooting guards
Sportspeople from Markham, Ontario
Texas Legends players
Undrafted National Basketball Association players
Westchester Knicks players